Ballads in Love: The Greatest Love Songs of Deen is the third self-cover album by Japanese pop band Deen. It was released on 6 November 2019 under the Epic Records Japan label. It's their second self-cover album for the first time in 14 years. The track list is based on the final results of the online inquiry, filled by the fans. The tracks are completely new recorded with the new string and piano arrangements.

This album was released in regular and the first press limited edition. The limited edition includes the second disc with the instrumental versions of the track lists from the first disc. Both of them includes one special bonus live track from the live sessions.

Commercial performance
The album reached #21 in its first week and charted for 4 weeks.

Track listing

References

Sony Music albums
Japanese-language albums
2019 albums
Deen (band) albums